Ya nunca más is a soundtrack album for a movie of the same title by Luis Miguel, which was released in 1984. Miguel had a major role in the film of the same name which was his film debut.

Track listing 

Musical arrangement: Chucho Ferrer and Peque Rossino

References 

Luis Miguel soundtracks
Musical film soundtracks
1984 soundtrack albums
EMI Records soundtracks
Spanish-language soundtracks